The Tamsui Art Gallery (TAG) is an arts center in Tamsui District, New Taipei, Taiwan.

History
The site of the art gallery used to be four Japanese-style dormitories located side by side. The art gallery was opened in 2011.

Architecture
The art gallery uses the tiles which used to be used from the previous dormitories to preserve their history.

Exhibitions
The art gallery exhibits various works by local artists about local history.

Transportation
The art gallery is accessible by bus from Tamsui Station of Taipei Metro.

See also
 List of tourist attractions in Taiwan

References

2011 establishments in Taiwan
Art centers in New Taipei
Art galleries established in 2011